The 2016 Supersport World Championship was the eighteenth season of the Supersport World Championship—the twentieth taking into account the two held under the name of Supersport World Series, a racing competition on production-based motorcycles of 600 to 750 cm³ displacement.

Kenan Sofuoğlu claimed the title for the fifth time in the championship's history with one race to spare. A portion of the full-time riders contested the European rounds only, scoring points for the World Championship standings and competing for the FIM Europe Supersport Cup; Axel Bassani was the Cup entry who amassed the most points in the overall championship standings and was awarded the European title.

Race calendar and results

Entry list

All entries used Pirelli tyres.

Championship standings

Riders' championship

Manufacturers' championship

Notes

References

External links

Supersport World Championship seasons
World